The 1979 Indiana State Sycamores football team represented Indiana State University as a member of the Missouri Valley Conference (MVC) during the 1979 NCAA Division I-A football season. Led by second-year head coach Dick Jamieson, the Sycamores compiled an overall record of 8–3 with a mark of 3–2 in conference play, placing third in the MVC. Indiana State played home games at Memorial Stadium.

The roster included such standout performers as: quarterback Reggie Allen, the 1979 MVC Offensive MVP; defensive end Gerry Glusic, the 1979 MVC Defensive MVP; defensive back Alvin Reynolds; linebacker Craig Shaffer, the 1981 MVC Defensive MVP; and offensive lineman Tunch Ilkin. Allen and Ilkin went on to careers in the National Football League (NFL), Reynolds as an assistant coach and Ilkin as a Pro Bowl-lineman for the Pittsburgh Steelers. Shaffer spent three seasons with the St. Louis Cardinals Glusic was named to the AP All-American Team. Six Sycamores would be named to the All-MVC Team: Allen, wide receivers Kirk Wilson and Eddie Ruffin, lineman George DeTella, Glusic, and defensive back John Allman. Allen, Glusic and Ilkin have been inducted into the Indiana State University Athletics Hall of Fame.

Schedule

References

Indiana State
Indiana State Sycamores football seasons
Indiana State Sycamores football